The Banach–Tarski paradox is a theorem in set-theoretic geometry, which states the following: Given a solid ball in three-dimensional space, there exists a decomposition of the ball into a finite number of disjoint subsets, which can then be put back together in a different way to yield two identical copies of the original ball. Indeed,  the reassembly process involves only moving the pieces around and rotating them without changing their shape. However, the pieces themselves are not "solids" in the usual sense, but infinite scatterings of points.  The reconstruction can work with as few as five pieces.

An alternative form of the theorem states that given any two "reasonable" solid objects (such as a small ball and a huge ball), the cut pieces of either one can be reassembled into the other. This is often stated informally as "a pea can be chopped up and reassembled into the Sun" and called the "pea and the Sun paradox".

The theorem is called a paradox because it contradicts basic geometric intuition. "Doubling the ball" by dividing it into parts and moving them around by rotations and translations, without any stretching, bending, or adding new points, seems to be impossible, since all these operations ought, intuitively speaking, to preserve the volume. The intuition that such operations preserve volumes is not mathematically absurd and it is even included in the formal definition of volumes. However, this is not applicable here because in this case it is impossible to define the volumes of the considered subsets. Reassembling them reproduces a set that has a volume, which happens to be different from the volume at the start.

Unlike most theorems in geometry, the mathematical proof of this result depends on the choice of axioms for set theory in a critical way. It can be proven using the axiom of choice, which allows for the construction of non-measurable sets, i.e., collections of points that do not have a volume in the ordinary sense, and whose construction requires an uncountable number of choices.

It was shown in 2005 that the pieces in the decomposition can be chosen in such a way that they can be moved continuously into place without running into one another.

As proved independently by Leroy and Simpson, the Banach–Tarski paradox does not violate volumes if one works with locales rather than topological spaces. In this abstract setting, it is possible to have subspaces without point but still nonempty. The parts of the paradoxical decomposition do intersect a lot in the sense of locales, so much that some of these intersections should be given a positive mass. Allowing for this hidden mass to be taken into account, the theory of locales permits all subsets (and even all sublocales) of the Euclidean space to be satisfactorily measured.

Banach and Tarski publication 
In a paper published in 1924, Stefan Banach and Alfred Tarski gave a construction of such a paradoxical decomposition, based on earlier work by Giuseppe Vitali concerning the unit interval and on the paradoxical decompositions of the sphere by Felix Hausdorff, and discussed a number of related questions concerning decompositions of subsets of Euclidean spaces in various dimensions. They proved the following more general statement, the strong form of the Banach–Tarski paradox:

Now let  be the original ball and  be the union of two translated copies of the original ball.

The strong form of the Banach–Tarski paradox is false in dimensions one and two, but Banach and Tarski showed that an analogous statement remains true if countably many subsets are allowed. The difference between dimensions 1 and 2 on the one hand, and 3 and higher on the other hand, is due to the richer structure of the group  of Euclidean motions in 3 dimensions. For  the group is solvable, but for   it contains a free group with two generators. John von Neumann studied the properties of the group of equivalences that make a paradoxical decomposition possible, and introduced the notion of amenable groups. He also found a form of the paradox in the plane which uses area-preserving affine transformations in place of the usual congruences.

Tarski proved that amenable groups are precisely those for which no paradoxical decompositions exist. Since only free subgroups are needed in the Banach–Tarski paradox, this led to the long-standing von Neumann conjecture, which was disproved in 1980.

Formal treatment 
The Banach–Tarski paradox states that a ball in the ordinary Euclidean space can be doubled using only the operations of partitioning into subsets, replacing a set with a congruent set, and reassembling. Its mathematical structure is greatly elucidated by emphasizing the role played by the group of Euclidean motions and introducing the notions of equidecomposable sets and a paradoxical set. Suppose that  is a group acting on a set . Two geometric figures that can be transformed into each other are called congruent, and this terminology will be extended to the general -action. Formally, if there exist non-empty sets ,  such that

and there exist elements  such that

 

Using this terminology, the Banach–Tarski paradox can be reformulated as follows:

 A three-dimensional Euclidean ball is equidecomposable with two copies of itself.

In fact, there is a sharp result in this case, due to Raphael M. Robinson: doubling the ball can be accomplished with five pieces, and fewer than five pieces will not suffice.

The strong version of the paradox claims:

 Any two bounded subsets of 3-dimensional Euclidean space with non-empty interiors are equidecomposable.

The Banach–Tarski paradox can be put in context by pointing out that for two sets in the strong form of the paradox, there is always a bijective function that can map the points in one shape into the other in a one-to-one fashion. In the language of Georg Cantor's set theory, these two sets have equal cardinality. Likewise, one ball can be made into a larger or smaller ball by stretching, or in other words, by applying similarity transformations. Hence, if the group  is large enough, -equidecomposable sets may be found whose "size"s vary. Moreover, since a countable set can be made into two copies of itself, one might expect that using countably many pieces could somehow do the trick.

On the other hand, in the Banach–Tarski paradox, the number of pieces is finite and the allowed equivalences are Euclidean congruences, which preserve the volumes. Yet, somehow, they end up doubling the volume of the ball! While this is certainly surprising, some of the pieces used in the paradoxical decomposition are non-measurable sets, so the notion of volume (more precisely, Lebesgue measure) is not defined for them, and the partitioning cannot be accomplished in a practical way. In fact, the Banach–Tarski paradox demonstrates that it is impossible to find a finitely-additive measure (or a Banach measure) defined on all subsets of a Euclidean space of three (and greater) dimensions that is invariant with respect to Euclidean motions and takes the value one on a unit cube. In his later work, Tarski showed that, conversely, non-existence of paradoxical decompositions of this type implies the existence of a finitely-additive invariant measure.

The heart of the proof of the "doubling the ball" form of the paradox presented below is the remarkable fact that by a Euclidean isometry (and renaming of elements), one can divide a certain set (essentially, the surface of a unit sphere) into four parts, then rotate one of them to become itself plus two of the other parts. This is often called the Hausdorff paradox.

Connection with earlier work and the role of the axiom of choice 

Banach and Tarski explicitly acknowledge Giuseppe Vitali's 1905 construction of the set bearing his name, Hausdorff's paradox (1914), and an earlier (1923) paper of Banach as the precursors to their work. Vitali's and Hausdorff's constructions depend on Zermelo's axiom of choice ("AC"), which is also crucial to the Banach–Tarski paper, both for proving their paradox and for the proof of another result:

 Two Euclidean polygons, one of which strictly contains the other, are not equidecomposable.

They remark:

 Le rôle que joue cet axiome dans nos raisonnements nous semble mériter l'attention
 (The role this axiom plays in our reasoning seems to us to deserve attention)

They point out that while the second result fully agrees with geometric intuition, its proof uses AC in an even more substantial way than the proof of the paradox. Thus Banach and Tarski imply that AC should not be rejected solely because it produces a paradoxical decomposition, for such an argument also undermines proofs of geometrically intuitive statements.

However, in 1949, A. P. Morse showed that the statement about Euclidean polygons can be proved in ZF set theory and thus does not require the axiom of choice. In 1964, Paul Cohen proved that the axiom of choice is independent from ZF – that is, it cannot be proved from ZF. A weaker version of an axiom of choice is the axiom of dependent choice, DC, and it has been shown that DC is  sufficient for proving the Banach–Tarski paradox, that is,

 The Banach–Tarski paradox is not a theorem of ZF, nor of ZF+DC.

Large amounts of mathematics use AC. As Stan Wagon points out at the end of his monograph, the Banach–Tarski paradox has been more significant for its role in pure mathematics than for foundational questions:  it motivated a fruitful new direction for research, the amenability of groups, which has nothing to do with the foundational questions.

In 1991, using then-recent results by Matthew Foreman and Friedrich Wehrung, Janusz Pawlikowski proved that the Banach–Tarski paradox follows from ZF plus the Hahn–Banach theorem. The Hahn–Banach theorem does not rely on the full axiom of choice but can be proved using a weaker version of AC called the ultrafilter lemma. So Pawlikowski proved that the set theory needed to prove the Banach–Tarski paradox, while stronger than ZF, is weaker than full ZFC.

A sketch of the proof 

Here a proof is sketched which is similar but not identical to that given by Banach and Tarski. Essentially, the paradoxical decomposition of the ball is achieved in four steps:

 Find a paradoxical decomposition of the free group in two generators.
 Find a group of rotations in 3-d space isomorphic to the free group in two generators.
 Use the paradoxical decomposition of that group and the axiom of choice to produce a paradoxical decomposition of the hollow unit sphere.
 Extend this decomposition of the sphere to a decomposition of the solid unit ball.

These steps are discussed in more detail below.

Step 1 

The free group with two generators a and b consists of all finite strings that can be formed from the four symbols a, a−1, b and b−1 such that no a appears directly next to an a−1 and no b appears directly next to a b−1. Two such strings can be concatenated and converted into a string of this type by repeatedly replacing the "forbidden" substrings with the empty string. One can check that the set of those strings with this operation forms a group with identity element the empty string e. This group may be called F2.

The group  can be "paradoxically decomposed" as follows: Let S(a) be the set of all non-forbidden strings that start with a and define S(a−1), S(b) and S(b−1) similarly. Clearly,

but also

and

where the notation aS(a−1) means take all the strings in S(a−1) and concatenate them on the left with a.

This is at the core of the proof.

That is exactly what is intended to do to the ball.

Step 2 
In order to find a free group of rotations of 3D space, i.e. that behaves just like (or "is isomorphic to") the free group F2, two orthogonal axes are taken (e.g. the x and z axes). Then, A is taken to be a rotation of  about the x axis, and B to be a rotation of  about the z axis (there are many other suitable pairs of irrational multiples of π that could be used here as well).

The group of rotations generated by A and B will be called H. 
Analyzing  and  modulo 3, one can show that . The same argument repeated (by symmetry of the problem) is valid when  starts with a negative rotation about the z axis, or a rotation about the x axis. This shows that if  is given by a non-trivial word in A and B, then . Therefore, the group H is a free group, isomorphic to F2.

The two rotations behave just like the elements a and b in the group F2: there is now a paradoxical decomposition of H.

This step cannot be performed in two dimensions since it involves rotations in three dimensions. If two rotations are taken about the same axis, the resulting group is the abelian circle group and does not have the property required in step 1.

An alternate arithmetic proof of the existence of free groups in some special orthogonal groups using integral quaternions leads to paradoxical decompositions of the rotation group.

Step 3 
The unit sphere S2 is partitioned into orbits by the action of our group H: two points belong to the same orbit if and only if there is a rotation in H which moves the first point into the second. (Note that the orbit of a point is a dense set in S2.) The axiom of choice can be used to pick exactly one point from every orbit; collect these points into a set M. The action of H on a given orbit is free and transitive and so 
each orbit can be identified with H. In other words, every point in S2 can be reached in exactly one way by applying the proper rotation from H to the proper element from M. Because of this, the paradoxical decomposition of H yields a paradoxical decomposition of S2 into four pieces A1, A2, A3, A4 as follows:

where we define

and likewise for the other sets, and where we define

(The five "paradoxical" parts of F2 were not used directly, as they would leave M as an extra piece after doubling, owing to the presence of the singleton {e}!)

The (majority of the) sphere has now been divided into four sets (each one dense on the sphere), and when two of these are rotated, the result is double of what was had before:

Step 4 
Finally, connect every point on S2 with a half-open segment to the origin; the paradoxical decomposition of S2 then yields a paradoxical decomposition of the solid unit ball minus the point at the ball's center. (This center point needs a bit more care; see below.)

N.B. This sketch glosses over some details. One has to be careful about the set of points on the sphere which happen to lie on the axis of some rotation in H. However, there are only countably many such points, and like the case of the point at the center of the ball, it is possible to patch the proof to account for them all. (See below.)

Some details, fleshed out 

In Step 3, the sphere was partitioned into orbits of our group H. To streamline the proof, the discussion of points that are fixed by some rotation was omitted; since the paradoxical decomposition of F2 relies on shifting certain subsets, the fact that some points are fixed might cause some trouble. Since any rotation of S2 (other than the null rotation) has exactly two fixed points, and since H, which is isomorphic to F2, is countable, there are countably many points of S2 that are fixed by some rotation in H. Denote this set of fixed points as D. Step 3 proves that S2 − D admits a paradoxical decomposition.

What remains to be shown is the Claim: S2 − D is equidecomposable with S2.

Proof. Let λ be some line through the origin that does not intersect any point in D. This is possible since D is countable. Let J be the set of angles, α, such that for some natural number n, and some P in D, r(nα)P is also in D, where r(nα) is a rotation about λ of nα. Then J is countable. So there exists an angle θ not in J. Let ρ be the rotation about λ by θ. Then ρ acts on S2 with no fixed points in D, i.e., ρn(D) is disjoint from D, and for natural m<n, ρn(D) is disjoint from ρm(D). Let E be the disjoint union of ρn(D) over n = 0, 1, 2, ... . Then S2 = E ∪ (S2 − E) ~ ρ(E) ∪ (S2 − E) = (E − D) ∪ (S2 − E) = S2 − D, where ~ denotes "is equidecomposable to".

For step 4, it has already been shown that the ball minus a point admits a paradoxical decomposition; it remains to be shown that the ball minus a point is equidecomposable with the ball. Consider a circle within the ball, containing the point at the center of the ball. Using an argument like that used to prove the Claim, one can see that the full circle is equidecomposable with the circle minus the point at the ball's center. (Basically, a countable set of points on the circle can be rotated to give itself plus one more point.) Note that this involves the rotation about a point other than the origin, so the Banach–Tarski paradox involves isometries of Euclidean 3-space rather than just SO(3).

Use is made of the fact that if A ~ B and B ~ C, then A ~ C. The decomposition of A into C can be done using number of pieces equal to the product of the numbers needed for taking A into B and for taking B into C.

The proof sketched above requires 2 × 4 × 2 + 8 = 24 pieces - a factor of 2 to remove fixed points, a factor 4 from step 1, a factor 2 to recreate fixed points, and 8 for the center point of the second ball. But in step 1 when moving {e} and all strings of the form an into S(a−1), do this to all orbits except one. Move {e} of this last orbit to the center point of the second ball. This brings the total down to 16 + 1 pieces. With more algebra, one can also decompose fixed orbits into 4 sets as in step 1. This gives 5 pieces and is the best possible.

Obtaining infinitely many balls from one 
Using the Banach–Tarski paradox, it is possible to obtain k copies of a ball in the Euclidean n-space from one, for any integers n ≥ 3 and k ≥ 1, i.e. a ball can be cut into k pieces so that each of them is equidecomposable to a ball of the same size as the original. Using the fact that the free group F2 of rank 2 admits a free subgroup of countably infinite rank, a similar proof yields that the unit sphere Sn−1 can be partitioned into countably infinitely many pieces, each of which is equidecomposable (with two pieces) to the Sn−1 using rotations. By using analytic properties of the rotation group SO(n), which is a connected analytic Lie group, one can further prove that the sphere Sn−1 can be partitioned into as many pieces as there are real numbers (that is,  pieces), so that each piece is equidecomposable with two pieces to Sn−1 using rotations. These results then extend to the unit ball deprived of the origin. A 2010 article by Valeriy Churkin gives a new proof of the continuous version of the Banach–Tarski paradox.

Von Neumann paradox in the Euclidean plane 

In the Euclidean plane, two figures that are equidecomposable with respect to the group of Euclidean motions are necessarily of the same area, and therefore, a paradoxical decomposition of a square or disk of Banach–Tarski type that uses only Euclidean congruences is impossible. A conceptual explanation of the distinction between the planar and higher-dimensional cases was given by John von Neumann: unlike the group SO(3) of rotations in three dimensions, the group E(2) of Euclidean motions of the plane is solvable, which implies the existence of a finitely-additive measure on E(2) and R2 which is invariant under translations and rotations, and rules out paradoxical decompositions of non-negligible sets. Von Neumann then posed the following question: can such a paradoxical decomposition be constructed if one allows a larger group of equivalences?

It is clear that if one permits similarities, any two squares in the plane become equivalent even without further subdivision. This motivates restricting one's attention to the group SA2 of area-preserving affine transformations. Since the area is preserved, any paradoxical decomposition of a square with respect to this group would be counterintuitive for the same reasons as the Banach–Tarski decomposition of a ball. In fact, the group SA2 contains as a subgroup the special linear group SL(2,R), which in its turn contains the free group F2 with two generators as a subgroup. This makes it plausible that the proof of Banach–Tarski paradox can be imitated in the plane. The main difficulty here lies in the fact that the unit square is not invariant under the action of the linear group SL(2, R), hence one cannot simply transfer a paradoxical decomposition from the group to the square, as in the third step of the above proof of the Banach–Tarski paradox. Moreover, the fixed points of the group present difficulties (for example, the origin is fixed under all linear transformations). This is why von Neumann used the larger group SA2 including the translations, and he constructed a paradoxical decomposition of the unit square with respect to the enlarged group (in 1929). Applying the Banach–Tarski method, the paradox for the square can be strengthened as follows:

 Any two bounded subsets of the Euclidean plane with non-empty interiors are equidecomposable with respect to the area-preserving affine maps.

As von Neumann notes:

"Infolgedessen gibt es bereits in der Ebene kein nichtnegatives additives Maß (wo das Einheitsquadrat das Maß 1 hat), das gegenüber allen Abbildungen von A2 invariant wäre."

"In accordance with this, already in the plane there is no non-negative additive measure (for which the unit square has a measure of 1), which is invariant with respect to all transformations belonging to A2 [the group of area-preserving affine transformations]."

To explain further, the question of whether a finitely additive measure (that is preserved under certain transformations) exists or not depends on what transformations are allowed. The Banach measure of sets in the plane, which is preserved by translations and rotations, is not preserved by non-isometric transformations even when they do preserve the area of polygons. The points of the plane (other than the origin) can be divided into two dense sets which may be called A and B. If the A points of a given polygon are transformed by a certain area-preserving transformation and the B points by another, both sets can become subsets of the A points in two new polygons. The new polygons have the same area as the old polygon, but the two transformed sets cannot have the same measure as before (since they contain only part of the A points), and therefore there is no measure that "works".

The class of groups isolated by von Neumann in the course of study of Banach–Tarski phenomenon turned out to be very important for many areas of Mathematics: these are amenable groups, or groups with an invariant mean, and include all finite and all solvable groups. Generally speaking, paradoxical decompositions arise when the group used for equivalences in the definition of equidecomposability is not amenable.

Recent progress 
 2000: Von Neumann's paper left open the possibility of a paradoxical decomposition of the interior of the unit square with respect to the linear group SL(2,R) (Wagon, Question 7.4). In 2000, Miklós Laczkovich proved that such a decomposition exists. More precisely, let A be the family of all bounded subsets of the plane with non-empty interior and at a positive distance from the origin, and B the family of all planar sets with the property that a union of finitely many translates under some elements of SL(2, R) contains a punctured neighborhood of the origin. Then all sets in the family A are SL(2, R)-equidecomposable, and likewise for the sets in B. It follows that both families consist of paradoxical sets.
 2003: It had been known for a long time that the full plane was paradoxical with respect to SA2, and that the minimal number of pieces would equal four provided that there exists a locally commutative free subgroup of SA2. In 2003 Kenzi Satô constructed such a subgroup, confirming that four pieces suffice.
 2011: Laczkovich's paper left open the possibility if there exists a free group F of piecewise linear transformations acting on the punctured disk D \{0,0} without fixed points. Grzegorz Tomkowicz constructed such a group, showing that the system of congruences A ≈ B ≈ C ≈ B U C can be realized by means of F and D \{0,0}.
 2017: It has been known for a long time that there exists in the hyperbolic plane H2 a set E that is a third, a fourth and ... and a -th part of H2. The requirement was satisfied by orientation-preserving isometries of H2. Analogous results were obtained by John Frank Adams and Jan Mycielski who showed that the unit sphere S2 contains a set E that is a half, a third, a fourth and ... and a -th part of S2. Grzegorz Tomkowicz showed that Adams and Mycielski construction can be generalized to obtain a set E of H2 with the same properties as in S2.
 2017: Von Neumann's paradox concerns the Euclidean plane, but there are also other classical spaces where the paradoxes are possible. For example, one can ask if there is a Banach–Tarski paradox in the hyperbolic plane H2. This was shown by Jan Mycielski and Grzegorz Tomkowicz. Tomkowicz proved also that most of the classical paradoxes are an easy consequence of a graph theoretical result and the fact that the groups in question are rich enough.
 2018: In 1984, Jan Mycielski and Stan Wagon  constructed a paradoxical decomposition of the hyperbolic plane H2 that uses Borel sets. The paradox depends on the existence of a properly discontinuous subgroup of the group of isometries of H2. Similar paradox is obtained by Grzegorz Tomkowicz  who constructed a free properly discontinuous subgroup G of the affine group SA(3,Z).
 2019: Banach–Tarski paradox uses finitely many pieces in the duplication. In the case of countably many pieces, any two sets with non-empty interiors are equidecomposable using translations. But allowing only Lebesgue measurable pieces one obtains: If A and B are subsets of Rn with non-empty interiors, then they have equal Lebesgue measures if and only if they are countably equidecomposable using Lebesgue measurable pieces. Jan Mycielski and Grzegorz Tomkowicz  extended this result to finite dimensional Lie groups and second countable locally compact topological groups that are totally disconnected or have countably many connected components.

See also

Notes

References 
 
 
 Edward Kasner & James Newman (1940) Mathematics and the Imagination, pp 205–7, Simon & Schuster.

External links 

 The Banach-Tarski Paradox by Stan Wagon (Macalester College), the Wolfram Demonstrations Project.
 Irregular Webcomic! #2339 by David Morgan-Mar provides a non-technical explanation of the paradox. It includes a step-by-step demonstration of how to create two spheres from one.
  gives an overview on the fundamental basics of the paradox.
 Banach-Tarski and the Paradox of Infinite Cloning

Group theory
Measure theory
Mathematical paradoxes
Theorems in the foundations of mathematics
Geometric dissection
1924 introductions
Paradoxes of infinity